Armin Ignaz Assinger (born 7 June 1964) is a former Austrian Alpine skier and current host of the Millionenshow and Domino Day.

Biography
Born in Graz (but growing up and living in Hermagor-Pressegger See, state Carinthia) he won a total of 4 World Cup races. He competed at the 1994 Winter Olympics.

World Cup victories

References

External links
 
 
 

1964 births
Living people
ORF (broadcaster) people
Austrian male alpine skiers
Olympic alpine skiers of Austria
Alpine skiers at the 1994 Winter Olympics